Batamay is the name of several rural localities in the Sakha Republic, Russia:
Batamay, Kobyaysky District, Sakha Republic, a selo in Kirovsky Rural Okrug of Kobyaysky District
Batamay, Lensky District, Sakha Republic, a selo in Saldykelsky Rural Okrug of Lensky District

Other uses 
Batamay (river), a river in Kobyaysky District, Sakha